The  St. Louis Gateway Film Critics Association Award for Best Supporting Actor is one of the annual awards given by the St. Louis Gateway Film Critics Association.

Winners

2000s

2010s

2020s

Supporting Actor
Film awards for supporting actor